HMS Manners has been the name of more than one ship of the British Royal Navy, and may refer to:

 , a destroyer launched in 1915 and sold in 1921
 , a frigate in commission from 1943 to 1945

Royal Navy ship names